The 1986/87 FIS Freestyle Skiing World Cup was the eight World Cup season in freestyle skiing organised by International Ski Federation. The season started on 8 December 1986 and ended on 27 March 1987. This season included four disciplines: aerials, moguls, ballet and combined.

Men

Moguls

Aerials

Combined

Ballet

Ladies

Moguls

Aerials

Ballet

Combined

Men's standings

Overall 

Standings after 33 races.

Moguls 

Standings after 9 races.

Aerials 

Standings after 9 races.

Ballet 

Standings after 7 races.

Combined 

Standings after 8 races.

Ladies' standings

Overall 

Standings after 34 races.

Moguls 

Standings after 9 races.

Aerials 

Standings after 9 races.

Ballet 

Standings after 8 races.

Combined 

Standings after 8 races.

References

FIS Freestyle Skiing World Cup
World Cup
World Cup